Zor (also Romanized as Zar) is a village in Jasb Rural District, in the Central District of Delijan County, Markazi Province, Iran. At the 2006 census, its population was 164, in 62 families.

References 

Populated places in Delijan County